Blepharucha is a genus of moths of the family Crambidae. It contains only one species, Blepharucha zaide, which is found in South Africa.

References

Endemic moths of South Africa
Odontiinae
Crambidae genera
Monotypic moth genera
Taxa named by William Warren (entomologist)